The 1901 Stetson Hatters football team represented the private Stetson College in the sport of American football during the 1901 college football season. The team's captain was Thomas P. Conpropst.

The team played the first intercollegiate football game in the state of Florida against the Florida Agricultural College in Jacksonville as part of the State Fair. Stetson won 6–0, after a sure FAC score was obstructed by a tree stump.

Schedule

See also
 List of the first college football game in each US state

References

Stetson
Stetson Hatters football seasons
College football undefeated seasons
Stetson Hatters football